The Neighbor (also known as My Neighbor) is a 2012 South Korean suspense thriller starring Kim Yunjin in the lead role.

In the film, residents of an apartment building suspect that one of their neighbors may be a serial killer responsible for the murder of a residing family's daughter. As the victim's stepmother investigates, the killer begins to target another young girl.

Based on Kang Full's eponymous webtoon, the film sold over 2.43 million tickets, becoming the highest grossing film among the movie adaptations of Kang Full’s works.

Plot
What would you do if you found out someone living in your building is a serial killer? A man, whose identity is known, kills his own neighbors ― including a middle-school girl ― living in his building, and continues to stay there even after committing the grisly murders.

All the neighbors in the film are reluctant to act due to self-interest. One character does not want the property price to fall after a scandal. Another wants to avoid attention from the police, as he has just five months left before his statute of limitations runs out. Some simply do not want to meddle without evidence, clinging to their daily routines. Meanwhile, the criminal continues to kill.

Cast
Kim Yunjin - Song Kyung-hee, stepmother of dead girl
Kim Sae-ron - Won Yeo-seon (first victim) / Yoo Soo-yeon
Chun Ho-jin - Pyo Jong-rok
Jang Young-nam - Ha Tae-seon
Im Ha-ryong - Kim Sang-young
Ma Dong-seok - Ahn Hyuk-mo, ex-con and loan shark
Kim Sung-kyun - Ryu Seung-hyuk, crew man of fishing vessel
Do Ji-han - Ahn Sang-yoon
Kim Jung-tae - Kim Jong-guk, ghost
Jung In-gi - Kim Hong-jung, Ahn Hyuk-mo's uncle
Kim Ki-cheon - Hwang Jae-yeon, security guard 1
Cha Hyeon-woo - Detective Lee
Kwak Min-seok - Ahn Dong-joo, pizza store owner
Cha Kwang-soo - Won Jung-man, Won Yeo-seon's father

Awards and nominations
2012 Grand Bell Awards
Best New Actor - Kim Sung-kyun

2012 Korean Association of Film Critics Awards
Best New Actor - Kim Sung-kyun

2012 Blue Dragon Film Awards
Nomination - Best New Director - Kim Hwi
Nomination - Best Supporting Actor - Ma Dong-seok
Nomination - Best Supporting Actress - Jang Young-nam

2012 Busan Film Critics Awards
Best New Actor - Kim Sung-kyun

2013 Baeksang Arts Awards
Best Supporting Actor - Ma Dong-seok
Nomination - Best New Director - Kim Hwi

2013 Buil Film Awards
Nomination - Best Supporting Actor - Ma Dong-seok

See also
Law
Crime
Murder
Abuse
Child abuse

References

External links 
  
 
 
 
 The Neighbor original webtoon at Daum 

2012 films
2012 crime thriller films
2010s serial killer films
South Korean crime thriller films
South Korean serial killer films
Films set in apartment buildings
Films shot in Busan
Films based on South Korean webtoons
Films based on works by Kang Full
Lotte Entertainment films
2010s Korean-language films
Live-action films based on comics
2010s South Korean films